Mesicothrips is a genus of thrips in the family Phlaeothripidae.

Species
 Mesicothrips inquilinus
 Mesicothrips plicans

References

Phlaeothripidae
Thrips
Thrips genera